Encephalartos dolomiticus, the Wolkberg cycad, is a critically endangered species of cycad. It is only found in the Wolkberg at elevations of 1100–1500 meters. The area is near Penge in southeastern Limpopo Province, South Africa.

Description
It is an arborescent plant, with a stem up to 2 m long and with a diameter of 40 cm, at the base of which often some shoots grow.

The leaves, arranged like a crown at the apex of the stem, are 60–80 cm long and bluish in color and sometimes twisted on their own axis. The lanceolate leaflets, 12–17 cm long, are arranged on the rachis in the opposite way, at an angle of 45°; the margins are whole and the lower one can be equipped with small denticles. The petiole is straight and equipped with small spines.

It is a dioecious species, with green ovoid male cones, 35–50 cm long and 10 cm broad. The female cones, of the same shape, are 30–45 cm long and have a diameter of 18–25 cm. Up to three cones can grow on each plant at a time. Macrosporophylls have a typically warty surface.

The seeds, 30–35 mm long, have an oblong shape and are covered by a yellow sarcotesta.

References

External links
 
 

dolomiticus
Plants described in 1988
Flora of the Northern Provinces